Epipsestis meilingchani is a moth of the family Drepanidae first described by Gyula M. László and Gábor Ronkay in 2000. It is found in Taiwan.

The wingspan is 32–37 mm. Adults are on wing from October to the end of February.

Etymology
The species is named for Miss Mei-Ling Chan, assistant curator and collection manager of the Entomology Division of Collection and Research in the National Museum of Natural Science.

References

Moths described in 2000
Thyatirinae